Gutenberg-Stenzengreith is a municipality since 2015 in the Weiz District of Styria, Austria. It was created as part of the Styria municipal structural reform, at the end of 2014, by merging the former towns of Gutenberg an der Raabklamm and Stenzengreith.

Geography

Municipality arrangement 
The municipality territory includes the following five sections and like-named Katastralgemeinden (populations and areas: as of 2015):

Politics

Mayor 
On 27 April 2015, Vinzenz Mautner (SPÖ) was elected mayor. Mautner was clear to see the vote prevail against the former mayor of Gutenberg and the interim government commissioner, Thomas Wild, with 7:8 votes.
Thomas Wild had to settle for vice-mayor, and town treasurer as Erwin Neubauer (ÖVP) of the municipality.

Town council 
The municipal council consists of 15 members and convened on the results of the 2015 election as follows:
 7 Mandatare of ÖVP
 5 Mandatare of SPÖ
 2 Mandatare of Die Grünen
 1 Mandatar of FPÖ

The prior elections brought the following results:

Coat of arms 

The award of the town crest followed with  Wirkung of 1 August 1984 to the town Gutenberg an der Raabklamm. By way of the merger, the crest lost its official validity on 1 January 2015. The new award was on 15 February 2015.
Blazon (crest description):
 "In ermine, a black anchor inverted (Wurfparte)“.

References

External links 

 Town Gutenberg-Stenzengreith: Offizieller Internetauftritt
 Former town Stenzengreith: Internetauftritt 

Cities and towns in Weiz District